University of Computer Studies in Sittway (UCSS) is located in Pyitawthar quarter, Sittwe, Rakhine State, Myanmar. It was formerly opened as Government Computer College on 1 October 2001, and was promoted to university level on 20 January 2007. Professor Dr. Zaw Tun (PhD (IT)) is the principal of University of Computer Studies (Sittway). In 2018, there are over 300 students in University of Computer Studies (Sittway).

Department
 Faculty of Computer Systems and Technologies
 Faculty of Computer Science
 Faculty of Information Science
 Faculty of Computing
 Department of Languages
 Department of Natural Science
 Department of Information Technology Support and Maintenance

Programs

Technological universities in Myanmar
Sittwe
Buildings and structures in Rakhine State

External links
Online Learning Management System - Computer University Sittwe

Official website